The INeedAPencil is a not-for-profit website created in 2006 by tutor Jason Shah, a graduate of Harvard University. The site supplies a free online collection of more than 60 lessons in math, reading, and writing that invoke pop culture to make them more entertaining. There are over 800 practice exam questions that simulate the SAT and provide full explanations.

INeedAPencil was acquired in 2011 by CK-12 Foundation, an educational non-profit.

See also 
 College Board
 Educational Testing Service
 Standardized test

References

External links
INeedAPencil web site

Harvard University
Non-profit technology
American educational websites